Zoon is a 1996 album by Nefilim.

zoon politikon, political animal in Aristotle
 zoon, a colonial organism. See zooid.

Zoon is the Dutch for "son", and is a surname. People with that name include:
 Jacques Zoon (born 1961), Dutch flutist
 Jan Zoon (1923-2016), Dutch politician and economist
 Jet Zoon (born 1988), Dutch accordionist and composer
 Kathryn Zoon (born before 1970), American immunologist
 Zoon Van Snook (born Alec Snook, active from 2007), Belgian-born English composer, producer and remixer
 Zoon (journal) an academic journal that was absorbed by Acta Zoologica

See also
 Vader & Zoon, a Dutch newspaper gag-a-day comic strip by Peter van Straaten 1968-1987
 Verschoten & Zoon, a 1999 Belgian comedy TV series
 

Surnames of Dutch origin